Gurney House is a historic building located in Nainital, Uttarakhand, India, and was the residence of hunter-conservationist and writer Jim Corbett till he left India in 1947. Currently it is a private residence.

History

It is located near Nainital Lake, on Ayarpatta Hill and was built in 1881. Mary Jane Corbett, mother Jim Corbet moved here in 1881 after the death of her husband, Christopher William Corbett who was postmaster of Nainital.  The cottage was constructed in 1880 with the dismantled material of their earlier house on Alma Hill (which was on the hill on which a famous landslide occurred in 1880). And hence the name implies a house built of carted material from a dismantled house. Mary Jane lived here till she died on May 16, 1924. She was buried at the cemetery of the nearby St. John in the Wilderness, where her husband was previously buried 

The house stayed with the family till 1947, when Miss Margaret Winifred Corbett, Jim Corbett's sister, sold the house to Sharda Prasad Varma, while they left for Kenya. Currently, the house is a private residence and serves as a private museum, with some Jim Corbett memorabilia.

References

External links

Houses completed in 1881
Houses in India
1881 establishments in India
Nainital